The Record is the only daily (Monday–Friday) English language newspaper based in Sherbrooke, Quebec, Canada. It serves the Eastern Townships region of that province. It is one of the French-speaking province's last two English-language dailies; the other is the Montreal Gazette, which serves the anglophone community in Montreal.

Launched on February 9, 1897, by businessman Leonard Channell and originally known as the Sherbrooke Daily Record, it is one of the two last surviving English-language daily newspapers in the French-speaking province, the other being the much larger Montreal Gazette.

For the past several years, The Record has been a daily community newspaper for the anglophone minority in the Eastern Townships, without comprehensive coverage of national and world news.

"Talk", or "Talk of the Townships", a weekly television, arts and cultural insert, appears every Friday. Periodic sections focus on individual communities and events within the Record's service area.

Future Canadian media barons John Bassett and Conrad Black both got their starts in newspaper ownership as owner and co-owner, respectively, of the Sherbrooke Daily Record.

For years The Record was owned by Black's Hollinger International. In January 2006 it was purchased by Alta Newspaper Group, a partnership of Glacier Ventures International and former Hollinger executive David Radler.

Fire
In January 1999, a fire broke out in The Records offices, which were located on rue Delorme in Sherbrooke. The building and its contents, including the newspapers computers and presses, suffered heavy losses. The newspaper was temporarily moved to a location in nearby Lennoxville without its own press. 
A replacement press was eventually purchased and in June 2000 the newspaper moved into its current location on rue Galt Est, in Sherbrooke.

Former editors
 Leonard S. Channell, 1897–1899
 Victor E. Morrill, 1899–1909
 Harry Logie, 1909–1919
 Gordon Miller, 1919–1930
 Alfred Wood, 1930–1935
 Gordon Miller, 1935–1937
 J.K. Flaherty, ?-?
 Albert Reid, ?-?
 Don McMahon, ?-?
 Douglas Amaron, ?-?
 Gerald McDuff, ?-?
 George McFarlane, ?-?
 Arnold Agnew, ?-1959
 John Cranford, 1959–1963
 Hugh Doherty, 1963–1968
 Leonard Ryan, 1968–1969
 Leonard Coates, 1969–1970
 William Duff, 1970
 Paul Waters, 1971
 Ivy Weir, [nee Pankovitch], 1971
 C. Scott Abbott, 1971–1972
 Lewis Harris, 1972–1973
 Alex Radmanovich, 1973–1974
 Hugh Tait, 1974
 Barbara Verity, [Stevenson], 1974–1977
 James Duff, 1977–1981
 Charles Bury, 1981–1996
 Sharon McCully, 1996-2006
 Eleanor Brown, 2006-?
 Jennifer Young, ? -2009
 Michael McDevitt, (interim editor 2009) (assistant editor 2010)
 Daniel Coulombe, 2010-2014
 John Edwards, 2014

See also
List of newspapers in Canada

References

External links
 The Record official site
 Sherbrooke Daily Record scrapbook site from former editor Hugh Doherty

Newspapers published in Sherbrooke
English-language newspapers published in Quebec
Publications established in 1897
Alta Newspaper Group
Daily newspapers published in Quebec
1897 establishments in Quebec